Cassell is an unincorporated community located in the town of Troy, Sauk County, Wisconsin, United States.

The community bears the name of one J. N. Cassell.

Notes

Unincorporated communities in Sauk County, Wisconsin
Unincorporated communities in Wisconsin